Kutty is a common Tamil surname . Kutty is also a word in Tamil which means 'child'. In Tamil it is more often it comes as a suffix, and does not become a surname. Notable people bearing it include:

 Ahmad Kutty, North American Islamic scholar
 Asha Kelunni Kutty (born 1966), or Revathi, Indian actress and film director
 B. M. Kutty (1930–2019), Pakistani journalist
 Faisal Kutty, Canadian lawyer, writer and human rights activist
 Lola Kutty, or Anuradha Menon, Indian television actress and theatre artist
 Muhammad Kutty (born 1953), or Mammootty, Indian film actor and producer 
 Paloli Mohammed Kutty (born 1931), Indian politician
 Rosa Kutty (born 1964), former Indian woman athlete
 V. K. Madhavan Kutty (1934–2005), Indian journalist
 Veloor Krishnan Kutty (1936–2003), Indian satirist